Killar or Kilar is a town in Himachal Pradesh, India. It is headquarters of Pangi Tehsil in  Chamba district.

References 

Cities and towns in Chamba district